"Zeze" (stylized in all caps) is a song by American rapper Kodak Black featuring fellow American rappers Travis Scott and Offset. It was released by Atlantic Records on October 12, 2018. Produced by D. A. Doman, the song debuted at number two on the US Billboard Hot 100 behind "Girls Like You" by Maroon 5 featuring Cardi B and at number one in Canada.

Background
On August 18, 2018, Kodak Black was released from prison after having been arrested on multiple charges in January 2018. Only three weeks later, he was spotted in a recording studio with rapper Travis Scott. The footage of the artists listening to a new beat, which would later turn out to be the instrumental of "Zeze", subsequently became a viral meme.

Remix
On October 24, 2018, American rappers Tyga and Swae Lee released an unofficial remix called "Shine".
On November 5, 2018, South Korean rappers Xbf, Freaky, and Woozieboo released a remix track.

American rapper Joyner Lucas also remixed the song and it was released on November 22, 2018, as a diss track aimed at Tory Lanez.

The song has made a resurgence in 2020 because of short-video sharing platform TikTok in what is called the ZEZE Challenge.

Music video
An official music video of the song was released on November 23, 2018. It showed the cameraman messing up and Travis Scott, the video director fixing the mistakes. Offset couldn't make the set but however got on the stage for his verse.

Charts

Weekly charts

Year-end charts

Certifications

Release history

References

2018 singles
2018 songs
Atlantic Records singles
Canadian Hot 100 number-one singles
Kodak Black songs
Travis Scott songs
Offset (rapper) songs
Songs written by Offset (rapper)
Songs written by Travis Scott
Warner Records singles
Songs written by Kodak Black
Songs written by D.A. Got That Dope